Ice hockey at the 1996 Asian Winter Games took place in the city of Harbin, China. The spot for the North Korea team, which did not participate, was filled with Kazakhstan's entry into this Winter Asiad. This edition also marks the introduction of women's ice hockey event to the Winter Asian Games.

Schedule

Medalists

Medal table

Results

Men

Women

References

External links
Results Men
Results Women

 
1996
1996 Asian Winter Games events
1996
Winter
Ice hockey in China